The 2017 All-Ireland Senior Hurling Championship was the 130th staging of the All-Ireland Senior Hurling Championship since its establishment by the Gaelic Athletic Association in 1887. The championship began on 23 April 2017 and ended on 3 September 2017. The draw for the championship was held on 13 October 2016 and was broadcast live on RTÉ2.

Tipperary, the 2016 champions, were defeated by Galway in the All-Ireland semi-final. Meath fielded a team in the championship for the first time since 2004.

On 3 September 2017 Galway won the championship following a 0–26 to 2–17 defeat of Waterford in the All-Ireland final.	
This was their fifth All-Ireland title and their first in 29 championship seasons.

Format
The All-Ireland Senior Hurling Championship was a double-elimination tournament based on the Leinster and Munster provincial championships and the Christy Ring Cup. Fifteen teams took part.

The 2017 championship was the last to feature mostly knock-out Leinster and Munster championships. On 30 September 2017, the Special Congress held at Croke Park voted by 62% to restructure the Leinster and Munster championships as two provincial groups of five teams who compete on a round-robin basis.

Provincial championships
Connacht Senior Hurling Championship

This competition is no longer organised. Galway represent Connacht and participate in the Leinster Championship. The other Connacht teams can compete in the All-Ireland Senior Hurling Championship (tier 1) by gaining promotion through the tiers of hurling – the Christy Ring Cup (tier 2), the Nicky Rackard Cup (tier 3) and the Lory Meagher Cup (tier 4).

Leinster Senior Hurling Championship

Nine counties compete - seven from Leinster plus Galway and Kerry. Last year's Leinster champions receive a bye into the semi-final. The championship begins with a qualifier group involving the four weakest teams. The group winners and runners-up join four of the five strongest teams in the three Leinster quarter finals as the competition continues in a knock-out format. Two semi-finals and a final follow.

Last year's Leinster champions receive a bye into the semi-finals. The remaining six teams (four seeded teams plus the qualifier group winners and runners-up) play in three quarter-finals. An informal system of promotion or relegation operates in this round; if a team from the qualifier group wins their quarter-final, they will be seeded in next year's Leinster championship and the beaten seeded team will compete in next year's Leinster qualifier

In 2017 the bottom team in the Leinster qualifier group will be relegated to next year's Christy Ring Cup (2nd tier). Their place in next year's Leinster qualifier group will be taken by the winner of 2017's Christy Ring Cup.

Meath qualified for this year's Leinster Championship by winning the 2016 Christy Ring Cup.

Munster Senior Hurling Championship

Five of the six Munster counties compete. Kerry participates in The Leinster Hurling Championship (see above). The competition has a knock-out format. All of the beaten teams enter the All-Ireland qualifiers.

Ulster Senior Hurling Championship

Although this competition takes place, it is not part of the All-Ireland Senior Hurling Championship. Currently no Ulster teams qualify to play in this year's Leinster championship which means that winning the Christy Ring cup is their only route into this year's All-Ireland Senior Hurling Championship.

Qualifiers Format
A total of nine teams enter the qualifiers – five of the seven teams eliminated in Leinster before the final (three losing quarter-finalists and two losing semi-finalists), all three teams knocked-out in Munster before the final and the winners of 2017's Christy Ring Cup.

The fixtures are decided by draws which are detailed in the sections below. All qualifier matches are knock-out and eventually result in two teams who progress to the two All-Ireland quarter-finals.

Qualifiers Preliminary round 
The GAA congress held in Feb 2017 voted to allow the winners of the 2017 Christy Ring cup to enter the 2017 qualifiers in a new preliminary round. The Christy Ring cup winners play the losers of one of the three Leinster quarter finals.

Qualifiers Round 1 Format 
After the qualifiers preliminary round, the eight remaining qualifier teams play in four matches. A draw is made such that the three Munster teams are paired with three teams beaten in the Leinster championship. Teams who have already met in the Leinster championship cannot be drawn to meet again if such a pairing can be avoided. The draw was made on the morning of the 26 June.

Qualifiers Round 2 Format 
The four winners of round 1 play in two matches. Teams who have already met in the Leinster or Munster championships cannot be drawn to meet again if such a pairing can be avoided.

All-Ireland Format

The beaten finalists in the Leinster and Munster championships play the two winning teams from round two of the qualifiers in the two All-Ireland quarter-finals. In the semi-finals, the Leinster and Munster champions play the winners of the two quarter finals. The final normally takes place on the first Sunday in September.

Summary

Championships

Provincial championships

Leinster Senior Hurling Championship

Group stage

Leinster Knockout Stage

Matches 

Leinster Quarter-finals

Leinster Semi-finals 
Last year's Leinster champions receive a bye into the semi-finals. They are joined by the winners of the three quarter-finals.

Leinster final

Munster Senior Hurling Championship

Munster Quarter-final

Munster Semi-finals

Munster final

Ulster Senior Hurling Championship

Ulster Semi-finals

Ulster final

All-Ireland Qualifiers

Qualifiers Overall Format

A total of nine teams enter the qualifiers – five of the seven teams eliminated in Leinster before the final (three losing quarter-finalists and two losing semi-finalists), all three teams knocked-out in Munster before the final and the winners of 2017's Christy Ring Cup.

The fixtures are decided by draws which are detailed in the sections below. All qualifier matches are knock-out and eventually result in two teams who progress to the two All-Ireland quarter-finals.

Qualifiers preliminary round

Qualifiers Preliminary round Format

The GAA congress held in Feb 2017 voted to allow the winners of the 2017 Christy Ring cup to enter the 2017 qualifiers in a new preliminary round. The Christy Ring cup winners play the losers of one of the three Leinster quarter finals.

Qualifiers Preliminary Match

Qualifiers Round 1

Qualifiers Round 1 Format

After the qualifiers preliminary round, the eight remaining qualifier teams play in four matches. A draw is made such that the three Munster teams are paired with three teams beaten in the Leinster championship. Teams who have already met in the Leinster championship cannot be drawn to meet again if such a pairing can be avoided. The draw was made on the morning of the 26 June.

Qualifiers Round 1 Matches

Qualifiers Round 2

Qualifiers Round 2 Format

The four winners of round 1 play in two matches. Teams who have already met in the Leinster or Munster championships cannot be drawn to meet again if such a pairing can be avoided.

Qualifiers Round 2 Matches

All-Ireland Senior Hurling Championship

Bracket

All-Ireland Quarter-finals

The beaten finalists from the Leinster and Munster championships play the winners of round 2 of the qualifiers in the two quarter-finals. Teams who have already met in the Leinster or Munster championships cannot be drawn to meet again if such a pairing can be avoided.

All-Ireland Semi-finals
The Leinster and Munster champions play the winners of the two quarter-finals. Teams who have already met in the Leinster or Munster championships cannot be drawn to meet again if such a pairing can be avoided.

This year, as Cork had met both Tipperary and Waterford in the Munster championship, a repeat pairing could not be avoided. The draw took place on 24 July to decide the fixtures.

All-Ireland final

Championship Statistics

Top scorer overall

Top scorer in a single game

Clean sheets

Scoring events

Widest winning margin: 24 points
 Waterford 1-35 – 0-14  Offaly (Qualifier Round 1)
Most goals in a match:  7
 Tipperary 6-26 – 1-19  Dublin (Qualifier Round 2)
Most points in a match: 53
 Cork 2-27 – 1-26  Tipperary (Munster quarter-final)
Most goals by one team in a match: 6
 Tipperary 6-26 – 1-19  Dublin (Qualifier Round 2)
Highest aggregate score: 66
 Tipperary 6-26 – 1-19  Dublin (Qualifier Round 2)
Lowest aggregate score:  37
 Kilkenny 0-20 – 0-17  Limerick (Qualifier Round 1)
Most goals scored by a losing team: 3
 Wexford 1-20 – 3-11  Kilkenny (Leinster semi-final)
 Tipperary 0-28 – 3-16  Clare (All-Ireland quarter-final)

Miscellaneous

 Wexford defeated Kilkenny in the Leinster Championship for the first time since 2004.
 Waterford set a championship record by scoring 35 points against Offaly in their All-Ireland qualifier meeting.
 The All-Ireland qualifier between Tipperary and Westmeath was the first championship meeting between the two teams.
 Galway played Wexford in their first ever Leinster final meeting. The game set a new attendance record of 60,032 who saw Galway win their second Leinster senior championship.
Waterford defeated Kilkenny in the championship for the first time since 1959.
 In the Munster final, Patrick Horgan scored 0–13 to overtake Christy Ring's total of 33–205 to become Cork's top scorer of all time.
The first meeting of Galway and Waterford in the All-Ireland Hurling Final.	
The first final since 1996 not to involve one of the "Big Three" counties (Cork, Kilkenny and Tipperary).
Galway defeated Waterford for the very first time in the senior hurling championship.
 A peak audience of 1.1 million watched Galway beat Waterford in the hurling final on RTÉ, making it the most watched programme on RTÉ in 2017 at the time.
 For the first time, no county from Leinster reached the All-Ireland semi-final stage, with the four spots going to Cork, Galway, Tipperary and Waterford. (Galway currently play in the Leinster Championship but are geographically in Connacht.)
Kilkenny were eliminated in the qualifiers for the first time.

List of teams

Broadcast Rights
Matches will be broadcast live on television in Ireland on RTÉ and Sky Sports under a new five-year contract that was agreed in December 2016.
In the United Kingdom, matches will be shown on Sky Sports and worldwide coverage will be provided on GAAGO. RTÉ Radio 1 will also have full radio rights to all championship games which were previously shared with Newstalk.

RTÉ coverage will be shown on RTÉ One on The Sunday Game Live presented by Michael Lyster in high definition. Des Cahill will present The Sunday Game highlights and analysis show on Sunday evening.

Live Hurling On TV

RTÉ, the national broadcaster in Ireland, will provide the majority of the live television coverage of the championship in the first year of a five-year deal running from 2017 until 2021. Sky Sports will also broadcast a number of matches and will have exclusive rights to some games.

Awards
Sunday Game Team of the Year
The Sunday Game team of the year was picked on 3 September, which was the night of the final. The panel consisting of Brendan Cummins, Michael Duignan, Tomás Mulcahy, Jackie Tyrrell, Anthony Daly, Eddie Brennan and Cyril Farrell unanimously selected Galway's Gearóid McInerney as the Sunday game player of the year.	
	
 Anthony Nash (Cork)
 Adrian Tuohy (Galway)
 Daithí Burke (Galway)
 Noel Connors (Waterford)
 Pádraic Mannion (Galway)
 Gearóid McInerney (Galway)
 Padraic Maher (Tipperary)
 Jamie Barron (Waterford)
 David Burke (Galway)
 Kevin Moran (Waterford)
 Joe Canning (Galway)
 Michael ‘Brick’ Walsh (Waterford)
 Conor Whelan (Galway)
 Conor Cooney (Galway)
 Patrick Horgan (Cork)

All Star Team of the Year
On 2 November, the 2017 PwC All-Stars winners were announced. On 3 November 2017 at the presentation of the All-Star awards, Joe Canning was named as the All Stars Hurler of the Year with Conor Whelan named the All Stars Young Hurler of the Year.	
	
 Stephen O’Keeffe (Waterford) 
 Padraic Mannion (Galway) 
 Daithí Burke (Galway)
 Noel Connors (Waterford) 
 Padraic Maher (Tipperary) 
 Gearóid McInerney (Galway) 
 Mark Coleman (Cork) 
 Jamie Barron (Waterford)
 David Burke (Galway) 
 Kevin Moran (Waterford) 
 Joe Canning (Galway) 
 Michael Walsh (Waterford) 
 Conor Whelan (Galway) 
 Conor Cooney (Galway) 
 Patrick Horgan (Cork)

See also
 Tipperary senior hurling team season 2017
 Galway senior hurling team season 2017

References

2017 in hurling